Pakoštane is a village and a municipality in Croatia in the Zadar County.

It is a tourist town with many gravel beaches and pine woods.

Geography

According to the 2011 census, there are 4,123 inhabitants, in the following settlements:
 Drage, population 893
 Pakoštane, population 2,191
 Vrana, population 790
 Vrgada, population 249

97% of the population are Croats.

To the north of the town is the Lake Vrana Nature Park, a favorite picnicking site, abundant in fresh water fish. Further north of the lake, 6 km from Pakoštane, is the historic settlement of Vrana.

Materine užance
Materine užance (Mothers' customs) is an ethno-gastronomic event which takes place during the summer tourist season in Pakoštane. The event is organised by the Pakoštane Tourist Board and the Pakoštane Municipality. Materine užance has been taking place in the centre of Pakoštane every year since 2008. There are numerous stands in the centre of Pakoštane where authentic local food (boiled octopus, shellfish, pršut (smoked ham), cheeses, čućke, gnocchi, sweet desserts like mimice, fritule, kroštule, almonds in sugar, etc.) is prepared in front of visitors and can be tasted and purchased.

Notable residents
Croatian general Ante Gotovina grew up in Pakoštane.

References

Municipalities of Croatia
Populated coastal places in Croatia
Populated places in Zadar County